Itterswiller is a commune in the Bas-Rhin department in Alsace in north-eastern France.

Geography
The village is located on the eastern beginnings of the Vosges Mountains, between Molsheim to the north and Sélestat top the south.   It is a few kilometres to the west of the Autoroute A35, the principal north-south highway in Alsace.

Economy
Tourism is important to the local economy which is positioned on the Elsässer Weinstraße.   The village also takes a pride in its vineyards.

History
The village is on the course of a Roman road:  it is therefore believed that the area must have been settled during the Roman empire period.   The name is thought to come from the Latin "Itineris villa" which indicates a hostelry for travellers.

In terms of surviving written records, a so-called Letter of Indulgence to Itterswiller dates from 1330.

Celebrations
An annual church festival takes place at the end of September or start of October.

See also
 Communes of the Bas-Rhin department

References

Communes of Bas-Rhin
Bas-Rhin communes articles needing translation from French Wikipedia